Charles Louis Gilly (1911-1970) was an American botanist who was an expert in the flora of Central and South America. He, alongside Wendell Holmes Camp, coined the term biosystematics.

Gilly was born in Fairfield, Iowa. While employed at Iowa State University, he collected botanical specimens in Cuba, Mexico, Guatemala, and Nicaragua. He also studied the taxonomy of teosinte. After achieving his doctorate, he worked as professor and herbarium curator at Michigan State College until 1954. In 1970, he died in Traverse City, Michigan.

References

American botanists
People from Fairfield, Iowa
Iowa State University faculty
1911 births
1970 deaths